Schnappi's Winterfest is the second and final album from animated German crocodile, Schnappi. It was released in 2005.

Track listing 
"Jing! Jingeling! Der Weihnachtsschnappi!" 
"Wichtelweihnacht"
"Weihnachtsgrüße von Schnappi" 
"Im Weihnachtswald"
"Tante Billas Weihnachtsvilla"
"Weihnachtsfest mit Hase Moppel" 
"Flaschenpost"
"In der Haifischbar" 
"Flockenflug"
"Schokoweihnachtsmann" 
"Schlittenfahrt"
"Sternschnapper"
"Christkind"

Charts

References

Schnappi albums
2005 Christmas albums
Pop Christmas albums